Waldskopf is an Odenwald mountain in Hesse, Germany.

Mountains of Hesse